Bünsow Land is a land area at the inner end of Isfjorden at Spitsbergen, Svalbard. It forms a peninsula between Billefjorden and Sassenfjorden and Tempelfjorden. Bünsow Land is named after Friedrich Christian Ernestus Bünsow. 

Bünsow Land is included in the Sassen – Bünsow Land National Park.

References

Geography of Svalbard
Peninsulas of Spitsbergen